Franklin T. Tilton is a New Hampshire politician, and currently serves in the New Hampshire House of Representatives.

References

Living people
Republican Party members of the New Hampshire House of Representatives
21st-century American politicians
Year of birth missing (living people)